Julianne Moore is an American actress, prolific in film since the early 1990s. She is particularly known for her portrayals of emotionally troubled women in both independent and blockbuster films, and has received many accolades.

Among her numerous competitive awards, she has won an Academy Award, a British Academy Film Award, a Daytime Emmy Award, a Primetime Emmy Award, two Golden Globe Awards, and two Screen Actors Guild Awards. She is one of 12 actors in Academy Award history to receive two acting nominations in the same year. Moore is one of only two actresses (the other being Juliette Binoche) to have won "Europe's Triple Crown" (winning at all three most prestigious film festivals: Berlin, Cannes, and Venice film festivals for the same categories) for the category of Best Actress.

Major associations
The table below is ordered by awarding body, but can be sorted according to year, film, category, or result by clicking the arrow next to the column heading.

Academy Awards

Berlin International Film Festival

British Academy Film Awards

Cannes Film Festival

Emmy Awards

Golden Globe Awards

Screen Actors Guild Awards

Venice Film Festival

Other awards and nominations
The table below is ordered by awarding body, but can be sorted according to year, film, category, or result by clicking the arrow next to the column heading.

Notes

See also
 Julianne Moore filmography

References

External links
 
 
 

Awards and nominations
Moore, Julianne